Cryptocephalus alternans is a species of case-bearing leaf beetle in the family Chrysomelidae. It is found in the Middle America (Mexico) and the Southwestern United States (California, Arizona).

Subspecies
These two subspecies belong to the species Cryptocephalus alternans:
 Cryptocephalus alternans alternans Suffrian, 1852
 Cryptocephalus alternans jungovittatus R. White, 1968

Cryptocephalus alternans jungovittatus  measures  in length.

References

Further reading

 
 

alternans
Beetles of North America
Taxa named by Christian Wilhelm Ludwig Eduard Suffrian
Beetles described in 1852
Articles created by Qbugbot